Oxygen is the second album by American group Wild Orchid, released in 1998. Since its release, the album has sold over 200,000 copies worldwide.

Production
Thirty songs were written for Oxygen in a couple of months time and the ten best songs were chosen to be recorded. Wild Orchid also recorded cover versions of "Our Lips Are Sealed" and "You're No Good". The reason for the album's title was explained by Ridel in an interview with Hit Records stating that, "On this album we wanted to you know take a deep breath and leave more space, let things have room to breathe. Our sound's a little lighter and that was the concept of Oxygen."

Release and promotion
The album was released in September 1998 and coincided with their stint as Guess spokespersons and models and as hosts of the new Fox Family reality show Great Pretenders, in which kids and teens of all ages lip sync their favorite songs while competing for prizes. They went on a promotional tour throughout the U.S. and were guests on Donny and Marie, where they performed "Be Mine" (the album's lead single). From June 16 to August 28, 1999 the group opened for Cher during her Do You Believe? Tour alongside Cyndi Lauper for 52 dates. The group even made a guest appearance on the Beverly Hills 90210 episode "Beheading St. Valentine" where they performed "Declaration" and "Come As You Are" at the fictitious Peach Pit After Dark.

Rumored new version
Since Oxygen was a commercial failure, rumors were spread in 1999 about the group returning to the studio to record a new version of the album. When a remixed version of "Come As You Are" was leaked onto the internet, fans made assumptions that this version would appear on the new version of Oxygen, but it was never officially released and neither was a new version of Oxygen.

Track listing
"Be Mine" (Dave Deviller, Sean Hosein, Wild Orchid) – 3:29
"You're No Good (But I Like It)" (Clint Ballard, Jr.) – 3:19
"Come as You Are" (Rudy Perez) – 3:31
"Declaration" (Manuel Seal, Jr.) – 3:41
"Wasted Love" (Sylvia Bennett-Smith, Wild Orchid) – 4:41
"Our Lips Are Sealed" (Terry Hall, Jane Wiedlin) – 2:57
"Tic Toc" (John Carter, Todd Chapman, Wild Orchid) – 3:23
"Holding On" (includes interlude) (Full Force, Wild Orchid) – 4:09
"Take You Higher" (Ron Fair, Parental Advisory, Wild Orchid) – 3:29
"Make It Easy for Me" (Christopher Bolden, Wild Orchid) – 4:11
"You & Me" (Bennett-Smith, Wild Orchid) – 4:15
"In My Room" (Bobby Sandstrom, Wild Orchid) – 4:47

Personnel
Wild Orchid
Stacy Ferguson – vocals
Stefanie Ridel – vocals
Renee Sandstrom – vocals

Additional personnel
Christopher Bolden – drums, keyboard
Lenny Castro – percussion
Ron Fair – keyboards
Steve Forman – percussion
Full Force – performer
John Goux – guitar
Manny Lopez – Spanish guitar
Nate Love – drums, keyboard
Eric McKain – percussion
David McKelvy – harmonica
Lester Mendez – keyboards
David Paich – synthesizer, keyboard
Parental Advisory – organ
Dean Parks – guitar
Rudy Perez – keyboards
Steve Porcaro – synthesizer, keyboard
Bobby Sandstrom – keyboards
Deconzo Smith – bass
Aaron Zigman – keyboards
Producers: Christopher Bolden, Todd Chapman, Ron Fair, Full Force, Nate Love, David Paich, Rudy Perez, Bobby Sandstrom, Manuel Seal, Jr.
Executive producer: Ron Fair
Engineers: Ron Fair, Doug Nemec, Joel Numa, Bruce Swedien, Jay Gordon
Assistant engineer: Joel Numa, Jay Gordon
Mixing: Peter Mokran, Gerard Smerek, Tommy Vicari
Mixing assistants: Jeff Griffin, Tim Lauber, Brian Young
Mastering: Ted Jensen
Programming: Christopher Bolden, Sean Hosein, Nate Love, Lester Mendez
Arrangers: Ron Fair, David Paich, Rudy Perez, Bobby Sandstrom
Art direction: Henry Marquez
Photography: Andrew Southam

Charts
Singles - Billboard (North America)

References 

1998 albums
Wild Orchid (group) albums
Albums produced by Ron Fair
RCA Records albums